Just Survive was a survival massively multiplayer online game developed and published by Daybreak Game Company for Microsoft Windows. The game, originally known as H1Z1 and later as H1Z1: Just Survive, is set during a zombie apocalypse in a rural area of the United States. In it, players attempt to survive against the natural elements such as wolves and bears, hordes of zombies, and thousands of potentially hostile survivors through interaction, scavenging for resources, building shelters, and crafting. The game released in early access in January 2015, selling over a million copies within two months, before being discontinued in October 2018.

Gameplay 
The gameplay of Just Survive emphasized multiplayer cooperation, trading, and team-building. Players scavenge supplies, craft items, and build strongholds to defend against the zombie horde. The main focus of the game involved surviving against zombies through teamwork with other players, rather than having a player versus player (PvP) environment with zombies as a backdrop.

Release 
The game was released on Steam as an early access title on January 15, 2015. At release, the game suffered from severe technical issues. Players reported that they could not login to their account or enter any active server. Framerate issues, lack of voice chat and AI problems were also among the problems reported. A new bug, which made all servers go offline, was also introduced to the game after the developer released a patch to fix other problems. Despite the unstable launch, the game sold over a million copies within two months.

In February 2016, Daybreak announced that the game originally known as simply H1Z1 had split into two separate projects with their own dedicated development teams, subtitled Just Survive and King of the Kill. In August 2017, the game's title dropped the H1Z1 brand name, becoming simply Just Survive. The game became delisted for purchase on August 26, 2018, resulting in all of its Steam Community Market content such as skins becoming devalued and unusable. Its servers shut down on October 24, 2018.

References

External links

Early access video games
Open-world video games
Post-apocalyptic video games
Video games developed in the United States
Video games set in the United States
Cancelled Windows games
Video games about zombies
Video games featuring protagonists of selectable gender
Inactive massively multiplayer online games
Products and services discontinued in 2018